Culex torrentium is a species of mosquito in the family Culicidae. This species has a wide distribution in the temperate Palaearctic region.

Description
The species is very similar to Culex pipiens. The most reliable characteristics for distinguishing Culex torrentium from Culex pipiens are found in males, namely in the hypopygium. The dorsal arm of paraproct is pointed and twisted at the apex (not blunt as in Culex pipiens). The ventral arm of paraproct is long and recurved.

Distribution
Culex torrentium is found in Palaearctic. In a group of two sympatric species, Culex pipiens and Culex torrentium, proportion of Culex torrentium is increased from South to North. In Leningrad Region of Russia, Culex torrentium is less abundant species than Culex pipiens, based on preliminary studies.

References

Culex
Palearctic insects
Insects described in 1925